Ilkino is a rural locality (a selo) and the administrative center of Ilkinskoye Rural Settlement, Melenkovsky District, Vladimir Oblast, Russia. The population was 1,023 as of 2010. There are 8 streets.

Geography 
Ilkino is located on the Unzha River, 15 km south of Melenki (the district's administrative centre) by road. Osinki is the nearest rural locality.

References 

Rural localities in Melenkovsky District
Melenkovsky Uyezd